I Feel Alive is the fourth studio album by Canadian indie pop band, TOPS. The album was released on April 3, 2020.

Track listing

Personnel 
 Producer – Jane Penny and Davie Carriere 
 Mixing – Chris Coady
 Mastering – Greg Calbi
 Additional credits – Sebastian Cowan, Bronwyn Ford, Adam Byczkowski, John Moods, JJ Weihl, Austin Tufts, Shae Brossard

Charts

References

External links 
 I Feel Alive on Bandcamp

2020 albums
TOPS (band) albums
Arbutus Records albums